The Eight Gentlemen of Huainan were the eight scholars under the patronage of Liu An (劉安 Liú Ān), the prince of Huainan during the Western Han Dynasty. Together, they wrote the philosophical collection Huainanzi (淮南子, Huáinánzǐ, literally "The Philosophers of Huainan"). 

They were:

 Jin Chang (晋昌 Jìn Chāng),
 Lei Bei (雷被 Léi Bèi),
 Li Shang (李尚 Lǐ Shàng),
 Mao Bei (毛被 Máo Bèi),
 Su Fei (苏飞 Sū Fēi),
 Tian You (田由 Tián Yóu),
 Wu Bei (伍被 Wǔ Bèi), and
 Zuo Wu (左吴 Zuǒ Wú).

The "Bagong Mountain" ("Eight Gentlemen Mountain") in China is named after them.

8 Eight Immortals of Huainan
2nd-century BC Chinese people
Articles about multiple people in pre-Tang China
Octets